Jasper County is the tenth studio album by American country music singer Trisha Yearwood. It was Yearwood's first studio album in four years since 2001's Inside Out.

Yearwood took a four-year break from recording after 2001 mainly because she began a relationship with Garth Brooks (whom she would later marry) and creative time. It was given a positive review by AllMusic, who called the album "one of her very best records."

The album reached number 1 on the Billboard country albums chart. It was also her highest peak on the Billboard 200, peaking at number 4. Her final album for MCA Nashville, it produced the singles "Georgia Rain" and "Trying to Love You", which peaked at number 15 and number 52, respectively, on the Hot Country Songs charts; the latter was also a number 28 hit on the Hot Adult Contemporary Tracks charts. Later presses of the album also included "Love Will Always Win", a number 23-peaking duet with her husband, Garth Brooks, which was also on Brooks's 2006 The Lost Sessions album. The track "Who Invented the Wheel" was originally recorded by Anthony Smith on his debut album If That Ain't Country.

Track listing

Notes
 "Love Will Always Win" was only included on 2006 re-release.

Personnel 
 Trisha Yearwood – lead vocals, backing vocals (3, 7)
 Matt Rollings – acoustic piano (1)
 Reese Wynans – organ (1, 11), acoustic piano (2, 11)
 Steve Nathan – acoustic piano (3)
 John Hobbs – organ (4, 9), acoustic piano (7)
 Steve Cox – organ (6, 8, 10)
 Mac McAnally – acoustic guitar (1, 3)
 Bryan Sutton – acoustic guitar (1, 5-11), acoustic slide guitar (2), acoustic baritone guitar (5), mandocello (6)
 Kurt Riles – acoustic guitar (4)
 Richard Bennett – acoustic guitar (11), electric guitar (11)
 Tom Bukovac – electric guitar (1, 3), acoustic guitar (3)
 Johnny Garcia – electric guitar (1, 4-11)
 John Jorgenson – electric guitar (1, 7)
 Al Anderson – electric guitar (2)
 Chris Leuzinger – electric guitar (7, 10)
 Paul Franklin – steel guitar (1)
 Aubrey Haynie – fiddle (1), mandolin (3)
 Wanda Vick – fiddle (2, 4), dobro (4)
 Sam Bush – mandolin (5)
 Dan Dugmore – lap steel guitar (5, 8), electric guitar (6, 9, 10, 11), steel guitar (7, 9)
 Rob Hajacos – fiddle (7)
 Michael Rhodes – bass
 Chad Cromwell – drums (1, 4-11), sticks (4)
 Shannon Forrest – drums (2)
 Greg Morrow – drums (3)
 Eric Darken – shaker (3), percussion (4, 6, 7, 9, 10), hubcap (4)
 Terry McMillan – leg slaps (5), harmonica (5)
 David Campbell – string arrangements and conductor (3, 6)
 The Nashville String Machine – strings (3, 6)
 Bekka Bramlett – backing vocals (1, 2)
 Anthony Smith – backing vocals (1)
 Beth Nielsen Chapman – backing vocals (3)
 Wes Hightower – backing vocals (3, 4)
 Leslie Satcher – backing vocals (4)
 Jessi Alexander – backing vocals (5)
 Jon Randall – backing vocals (5)
 Maia Sharp – backing vocals (6)
 Garth Brooks – backing vocals (7), lead vocals (12)
 Bob Bailey – backing vocals (8)
 Kim Fleming – backing vocals (8)
 Vicki Hampton – backing vocals (8)
 Ronnie Dunn – backing vocals (9)
 Hillary Lindsey – backing vocals (10)
 Jim Lauderdale – backing vocals (11)

The Nashville String Machine
 Anthony LaMarchina and Carole Rabinowitz – cello 
 Monisa Angell, Jim Grosjean and Kristin Wilkinson – viola 
 David Angell, David Davidson, Conni Ellisor, Carl Gorodetzky, Pamela Sixfin, Alan Umstead, Cathy Umstead and Mary Kathryn Vanosdale – violin 

The Alright Boys on "It's Alright"
 Steve Cox, Chad Cromwell, Dan Dugmore, Garth Fundis, Johnny Garcia, Scott Paschall, Michael Rhodes and Bryan Sutton

Production 
 Garth Fundis – producer 
 Matt Andrews – recording (1, 3)
 Jeff Balding – recording (2, 4-11), mixing 
 Chad Carlson – additional recording, recording assistant, mix assistant 
 Jesse Amend – technical assistant
 Jay Fenstermaker – technical assistant
 Erick Jaskowiak – technical assistant
 Bob Ludwig – mastering
 Gateway Mastering (Portland, Maine) – mastering location 
 Scott Paschall – production assistant
 Ron Roark – graphic design
 Virginia Team – art direction
 Luellyn Latocki – art direction
 Russ Harrington – photography
 Beth Barnard – additional photography 
 Gwen Yearwood – additional photography 
 Libby Mitchell – wardrobe stylist
 Sheri McCoy-Haynes – wardrobe stylist
 Debra Wingo – hair stylist
 Mary Beth Felts – make-up
 Vector Managerment – management team

Charts

Weekly charts

Year-end charts

Singles

Certifications

References

External links

MCA Records albums
Trisha Yearwood albums
2005 albums
Albums produced by Garth Fundis